Matthew Michael Macri (born May 29, 1982) is an American former Major League Baseball third baseman who played for the Minnesota Twins in 2008.

Amateur career
A native of Des Moines, Iowa, Macri graduated from Dowling Catholic High School in 2001 and went to the University of Notre Dame. He played ball there briefly his Freshman year before undergoing Tommy John surgery. In 2003, he played collegiate summer baseball with the Brewster Whitecaps of the Cape Cod Baseball League. In , Macri was named Second Team All-America by Baseball America, Collegiate Baseball Magazine, and USA Today.

Professional career
The Colorado Rockies drafted Macri in the 5th round of the 2004 Major League Baseball Draft as the 140th overall draft pick. He joined the Rockies Single-A affiliate Tri-City Dust Devils later that year hitting .333 with seven home runs and 43 RBI making the league's All-Star team. When healthy, he played most of the season with the Rockies High A affiliate Modesto Nuts hitting .283 with 7 home runs and 34 RBI before being called up to the Double-A Tulsa Drillers for one game.

Macri stayed in Tulsa for all of  hitting .232 with 8 home runs and 35 RBI before suffering a season ending left wrist fracture. Macri was called up to the Triple-A Colorado Springs Sky Sox where he played in only three games before being traded to the Twins for pitcher Ramón Ortiz on August 15. He finished the season in Rochester playing in 14 games. Macri played in the Arizona Fall League helping the Phoenix Desert Dogs win the league championship. He drove in and scored a run in the championship game.

Macri started the  season with Rochester playing in 25 games before straining his left calf during an at-bat against the Pawtucket Red Sox on April 28.

Macri was called up to the Twins on May 22 making his Major League debut on May 24 against the Detroit Tigers at Comerica Park. He earned his first major league hit in his first at-bat of the game off Nate Robertson. Macri then singled to right in his 2nd major league at-bat and drove in his first RBI.

On August 18, 2009 the Twins designated Macri for assignment to make room on the 40-man roster for Philip Humber.

On December 23, 2010 the Rockies announced that they had signed Macri to a minor-league contract. He played with the Colorado Springs Sky Sox in 2011.

References

External links

1982 births
Living people
Baseball players from Des Moines, Iowa
Major League Baseball third basemen
Rochester Red Wings players
Tri-City Dust Devils players
Modesto Nuts players
Tulsa Drillers players
Colorado Springs Sky Sox players
Notre Dame Fighting Irish baseball players
Brewster Whitecaps players
Minnesota Twins players